Leon Mark McKenzie (born 17 May 1978) is an English former professional footballer who played as a forward from 1995 to 2013 who scored in all four English professional leagues during his career. He was also a professional boxer, competing in the super middleweight class.

McKenzie started his professional career with Crystal Palace in 1995. He also appeared for Fulham and Peterborough United on loan whilst with The Eagles before securing a permanent move to Peterborough in 2000. Three years later he joined Norwich City and was a part of the side which won promotion to the Premier League. He went on to play for Coventry City, Charlton Athletic and Northampton Town before dropping into non-league football with Kettering Town and Corby Town. He retired from competitive football on 1 January 2013. Following his football career, he went on to become a professional boxer. He is a former International masters champion. English and Southern area challenger. He retired in 2017.

Football career
McKenzie began his career with his local club Crystal Palace, making his debut during the 1995–96 season. In 1997, he was loaned to Fulham and in 1998 to Peterborough United, where he scored 9 goals in 15 games.

In 2000 McKenzie joined Peterborough on a permanent basis for a fee of £25,000. In three years at London Road he scored 49 goals in 103 games.

He joined Norwich from Peterborough in December 2003 for a fee of £325,000, and instantly won over the Canaries supporters by scoring twice on his debut to help beat local rivals Ipswich Town at Portman Road and go top of the First Division. His goals made a significant contribution to Norwich's promotion to the Premier League as First Division champions at the end of the 2003–04 season. Within a year, he had turned from a Second Division to a Premiership player. McKenzie took time to find his feet in the Premiership but he established a strike partnership with Dean Ashton which would become one of the most potent in the division during the closing stages of the 2004–05 season. His goals helped Norwich to haul themselves into contention to avoid the drop, although they were relegated on the last day of the season.

He came third in the Norwich City Supporters Player of The Season vote for the 2004–05, beaten by Darren Huckerby and Damien Francis. The 2005–06 season for McKenzie was interrupted by injuries and personal difficulties surrounding the break-up of his marriage. At the start of the 2006–07 campaign, he handed in a transfer request to manager Nigel Worthington. Although Worthington rejected McKenzie's request, he subsequently confirmed that McKenzie would be sold if they received an offer that matched the club's valuation of the player.

McKenzie was signed by Coventry City on transfer deadline day in August 2006 for an initial £600,000 that, depending on appearances and promotion, could rise to £1m. Coventry's first match after signing McKenzie was against Norwich – however, McKenzie was unable to play due to a condition of the transfer that prevented him from playing in either of the two fixtures between Coventry and Norwich in the 2006–07 season. He made his debut for Coventry on 12 September 2006 as a substitute against Ipswich Town at Portman Road. He started the 2007–08 season well, scoring against Barnsley on the opening day of the season and against Hull, before a knee injury put him out of action for several weeks. He scored in Coventry's opening game of the 2008–09 season against his old club, Norwich City. This marked McKenzie's 100th professional career goal and he celebrated by revealing a vest with "100" on it. He was subsequently booked for his celebration.

On 1 September 2009 it was confirmed that he had signed for Charlton Athletic. He scored his first and only goal for Charlton against Southampton in the Football League Trophy on 11 November 2009. He was one of six players to be released by Charlton Athletic following the end of the 2009–10 league season. On 8 September 2010 it was confirmed he had signed a contract with Northampton Town until the end of 2010–11 season.

McKenzie featured in a friendly for Conference club Luton Town against Bedford Town prior to the 2011–12 season. On 15 December 2011 Mckenzie announced his retirement from professional football. He played his final game on 17 December 2011, after which he made a music single teaming up. ambitions. In July 2012, however, McKenzie came out of retirement to sign for Conference North side Corby Town.

On 1 January 2013 Leon played his last football game for Conference North side Corby Town and is now officially retired from football.

Personal life
He is the son of former British and European boxing champion Clinton McKenzie and nephew of three time world boxing champion Duke McKenzie. Leon has written an autobiography which was published by MacAnthony Media, and was released on 29 November 2012. Leon is a head coach at 12x3 gym in Aldgate East and speaks internationally about mental health. Leon is divorced and has five children - Kasey McKenzie, Mariya McKenzie, Naima McKenzie, Talia McKenzie and Teagan-Faith Courtney Mckenzie.

McKenzie has admitted battling depression. He was jailed for six months on 21 February 2012 for trying to avoid speeding convictions. In December 2011 McKenzie admitted that he had tried to commit suicide whilst a player with Charlton. McKenzie has gone onto be a speaker and ambassador for mental health.

Boxing career
McKenzie made his boxing debut on 29 June 2013 when he fought John Mason at York Hall, Bethnal Green in London. The fight was stopped in the second round with McKenzie picking up a victory in his first professional bout.

On 14 March 2015 McKenzie won his first title by beating Ivan Stupalo at York Hall to win the International masters belt, which made him the mandatory challenger for the Southern area title. On 17 October 2015 McKenzie beat the previously undefeated John McCallum at York Hall. The contest was brought to a halt at the end of the sixth round after McCallum was pulled out by his corner after suffering a badly damaged left eye. This edged McKenzie closer to a shot at the British super-middleweight title.

On 12 November 2016 McKenzie fought Jahmaine Smyle at York Hall for the English super-middleweight title, but lost for the first time in his career.

On 10 September 2017 McKenzie retired from boxing, after a four-year career. He said he hopes to change mental health issues and inspire in other ways to help people.

Professional boxing record

Honours

Promotions
2003–04: Division One Champions (promotion to The Premiership) twice, once with – Norwich City and once with Crystal Palace, Leon was on the bench for the play-off final at Wembley (1997), David Hopkin scored the winning goal.

Boxing Titles
International Masters Belt beut

References

External links

Profile at UpThePosh! The Peterborough United Database
Career information at ex-canaries.co.uk

1978 births
Footballers from Croydon
Living people
English footballers
English male boxers
Association football forwards
Premier League players
Crystal Palace F.C. players
Fulham F.C. players
Peterborough United F.C. players
Norwich City F.C. players
Coventry City F.C. players
Charlton Athletic F.C. players
Northampton Town F.C. players
Kettering Town F.C. players
English Football League players
National League (English football) players
English people of Jamaican descent
Corby Town F.C. players
Boxers from Greater London
Super-middleweight boxers